Just Being Myself is a studio album by American singer Dionne Warwick. It was released by Warner Bros. Records in 1973 in the United States. Her second album with the label, Just Being Myself marked a departure for Warwick who teamed up with Holland-Dozier-Holland to work on the majority of the album after her regular collaborators Burt Bacharach and Hal David had split the year before. The album peaked at number 178 on the US Billboard 200.

Critical reception

AllMusic editor Tim Sendra wrote that "the album's title is somewhat ironic because Holland, Dozier and Holland removed Warwick from the creative process, basically asking her to record her vocals over previously recorded backing tracks. Not that most of what they came up with was too far from what she had been recording before since the bulk of the record is made up of lush, orchestrated ballads [...] Just Being Myself is a very interesting and successful record that shows Warwick could be a convincing soul singer and despite her qualms, could succeed, artistically anyway."

Track listing
All tracks produced Holland-Dozier-Holland.

Personnel and credits 
Credits adapted from the liner notes of Just Being Myself.

McKinley Jackson – arrangements
Jerry Hall – recording, mixing
Brian Holland – recording, mixing
Lawrence Horn – recording, mixing
Gene Page – arrangements
Ed Thrasher – photography
Barney Perkins – recording, mixing
Dionne Warwick – vocals

Charts

References

Dionne Warwick albums
1973 albums
albums arranged by Gene Page
albums produced by Brian Holland
albums produced by Lamont Dozier
albums produced by Edward Holland Jr.